Sebastián Martínez (born 4 December 1977) is an Austrian former footballer.

Personal life
Martínez was born in Austria, to the Uruguayan footballer Alberto Martínez. Martínez spent his early childhood in Uruguay, and holds dual citizenship.

References

External links
 

1977 births
Living people
Footballers from Vienna
Austrian footballers
Austria international footballers
Uruguayan footballers
Austrian people of Uruguayan descent
Sportspeople of Uruguayan descent
Club Nacional de Football players
SK Rapid Wien players
SV Ried players
First Vienna FC players
Austrian Football Bundesliga players
Expatriate footballers in Honduras
Association football midfielders